Roy Beggs Jr (born 3 July 1962) is an Ulster Unionist Party (UUP) politician, who was a Member of the Northern Ireland Assembly (MLA) for East Antrim from 1998 until March 2022. 
Beggs is the son of the politician Roy Beggs, who was the UUP Member of Parliament (MP) for East Antrim from 1983 to 2005.

He served as a local councillor on Carrickfergus Borough Council from 2001 to 2011. During this period he had been elected as Chairman of the District Policing Partnership and vice-chairman of the Local Strategic Partnership and of the Community Safety Partnership.

In 2011 Beggs was elected as a Deputy Speaker of the Northern Ireland Assembly.  He served as a member of the Assembly's Social Development Committee, Public Accounts Committee, Health Committee, Environment Committee, Finance Committee, Deputy Chairman of the Agriculture Committee and Regional Development Committee. He is the Ulster Unionist Party spokesperson on Social Development.

In 2003, Beggs succeeded in having Irish rebel music removed from the in-flight entertainment of Aer Lingus airplanes.  He complained of the "blatant promotion of militant, armed republicanism" on a music channel during a flight from Dublin to Boston after seeing that Derek Warfield had a radio channel dedicated to his music. Beggs, it was the same as "the speeches of Osama Bin Laden being played on a trans-Atlantic Arabian airline."

Aer Lingus removed the material from their flights stating: "It is something that should not have been on board and we removed it immediately we became aware of it."

He lost his seat in the 2022 Northern Ireland Assembly election.

Election results

Beggs Jr had successfully contested every election to the Northern Ireland Assembly from 1998 until he lost his seat to the Alliance Party in 2022. In 1998 Beggs Jr polled 16.1% of the popular vote; 16.7% in 2003; and 10.2% in 2007. Beggs Jr topped the poll in 1998 and 2003 and the UUP returned two candidates.

References

External links
Northern Ireland Assembly profile
Roy Beggs MLA official website
Ulster Unionist Party profile

1962 births
Living people
People from Larne
Alumni of Queen's University Belfast
Ulster Unionist Party MLAs
Northern Ireland MLAs 1998–2003
Northern Ireland MLAs 2003–2007
Northern Ireland MLAs 2007–2011
Northern Ireland MLAs 2011–2016
Northern Ireland MLAs 2016–2017
Northern Ireland MLAs 2017–2022
Members of Carrickfergus Borough Council
Presbyterians from Northern Ireland